The 2019 Liga 2 season was the 74th edition of the second tier of Federación Peruana de Futbol. The season play started in April 2019 and ended on 1 December 2019.

Before the season, the clubs Hualgayoc and Sport Rosario were relegated to the Copa Perú for outstanding debts with the SAFAP.

Sport Victoria was disabled mid-season and relegated to the Copa Perú for outstanding debts with the SAFAP.

Competition modus
The season has two phases: a home-and-away round-robin phase and a liguilla (league). The team with the most points at the end of the first phase will be crowned 2019 Liga 2 champions and will be promoted to the 2020 Liga 1. The teams who finished 2nd through 7th in the round-robin phase qualify to the liguilla which qualifies two teams to the 2019 Peruvian promotion play-offs. Seeds 4 through 7 play each other. The winners then play the teams in 2nd and 3rd place for a place in the promotion play-offs.

Teams

League table

Results

Liguilla

Quarterfinals

|}

Semifinals

|}

Top goalscorers

Promotion play-off

See also
 2019 Liga 1
 2019 Copa Perú

References

External links
  
Peruvian Segunda División news at Peru.com 
Peruvian Segunda División statistics and news at Dechalaca.com 
Peruvian Segunda División news at SegundaPerú.com 
 RSSSF

2019
2019 in Peruvian football